Timothy James Slyfield (born 30 January 1975) is a New Zealand judoka. He won a bronze medal in the 73–81 kg (half-middleweight) division at the 2002 Commonwealth Games. He won another bronze medal in the Men's -100 kg event at the 2014 Commonwealth Games.

He also represented New Zealand in the 2000 Summer Olympics at Sydney.

References

External links

1975 births
Living people
New Zealand male judoka
Commonwealth Games bronze medallists for New Zealand
Olympic judoka of New Zealand
Judoka at the 2000 Summer Olympics
Judoka at the 2002 Commonwealth Games
Judoka at the 2014 Commonwealth Games
Commonwealth Games medallists in judo
Medallists at the 2002 Commonwealth Games
Medallists at the 2014 Commonwealth Games